Albillos is a municipality and town in the province of Burgos, Spain, located about 10 kilometers from the province's capital, Burgos.

References 

Municipalities in the Province of Burgos